The 2016 EurAsia Cup presented by DRB-HICOM was the second edition of the EurAsia Cup, a team golf event contested between teams representing Asia and Europe. It was held from 15–17 January at the Glenmarie Golf and Country Club in Shah Alam, Selangor, Malaysia. The inaugural event in 2014 finished in a tie, and so the Cup was shared between the teams. For the 2016 edition, the team size was increased from 10 to 12 with a corresponding increase in the number of matches from 20 to 24.

The event had a $4,800,000 purse; $300,000 to each member of the winning team and $100,000 to each member of the losing team.

Europe comfortably won the match 18½ to 5½ and, in doing so, became the first winners of the trophy.

Teams

OWGR as of 11 January.
Yellow background indicates a captain's pick.

The Asian team was selected as follows: the leading four available Asian players from the 2015 Asian Tour Order of Merit as of 14 December, the leading four eligible and available Asian players from the Official World Golf Ranking as of 14 December, and four captain’s picks. The leading four Asian players from the Asian Tour Order of Merit were Anirban Lahiri (1), Shiv Chawrasia (4), Thongchai Jaidee (6) and Danny Chia (8). The leading Asian players from the Official World Golf Ranking were Hideki Matsuyama (15), An Byeong-hun (28), Jaidee (29), Kiradech Aphibarnrat (37), Lahiri (41), Kim Kyung-tae (59) and Shingo Katayama (60). Matsuyama did not play while Jaidee and Lahiri had already qualified through their Asian Tour Order of Merit positions. The captain's picks were Nicholas Fung, Prayad Marksaeng, Wang Jeung-hun and Wu Ashun.

OWGR as of 11 January.
Yellow background indicates a captain's pick.

The European team was selected as follows: the leading 10 available European players from the final 2015 European Tour Race to Dubai rankings plus two captain’s picks. The qualifiers from the Race to Dubai were Willett (2), Lowry (5), Sullivan (8), Wiesberger (9), Dubuisson (11), Fitzpatrick (12), Broberg (14), Kjeldsen (15), Wood (17), and Fisher (19); Rory McIlroy (1), Justin Rose (4), and Henrik Stenson (18) chose not to participate. Ian Poulter and Lee Westwood were chosen as captain picks.

Schedule
15 January (Friday) Four-ball x 6
16 January (Saturday) Foursomes x 6
17 January (Sunday) Singles x 12

Friday's matches (four-ball)

Saturday's matches (foursomes)

Sunday's matches (singles)

References

External links

EurAsia Cup
Golf tournaments in Malaysia
Eurasia Cup
Eurasia Cup
Eurasia Cup